Lorenzo may refer to:

People
 Lorenzo (name)

Places

Peru
 San Lorenzo Island (Peru), sometimes referred to as the island of Lorenzo

United States
 Lorenzo, Illinois
 Lorenzo, Texas
 San Lorenzo, California, formerly Lorenzo
 Lorenzo State Historic Site, house in New York State listed on the National Register of Historic Places

Art, entertainment, and media
Films and television
 Lorenzo (film), an animated short film
 Lorenzo's Oil, a film based on a true story about a boy suffering from Adrenoleukodystrophy and his parents' journey to find a treatment.
 Lorenzo's Time, a 2012 Philippine TV series that aired on ABS-CBN
Music
Lorenzo (rapper), French rapper
 "Lorenzo", a 1996 song by Phil Collins

Other uses
 List of storms named Lorenzo
 Lorenzo patient record systems, a type of electronic health record in the United Kingdom

See also
 San Lorenzo (disambiguation)
 De Lorenzo
 di Lorenzo
 Lorenzen (disambiguation)